Elaine Pagels, née Hiesey (born February 13, 1943), is an American historian of religion. She is the Harrington Spear Paine Professor of Religion at Princeton University. Pagels has conducted extensive research into early Christianity and Gnosticism.

Her best-selling book The Gnostic Gospels (1979) examines the divisions in the early Christian church, and the way that women have been viewed throughout Jewish history and Christian history. Modern Library named it as one of the 100 best books of the twentieth century.

Early life and education
Pagels (pronounced Paygulls) was born February 13, 1943, in California. She is the daughter of Stanford University botanist William Hiesey. According to Pagels, she has been fascinated with the Gospel of John since her youth. She found it to be "the most spiritual of the four gospels". After joining an Evangelical church at the age of 13, she quit when the church announced that a Jewish friend of hers who had been killed in a car crash would go to hell because he had not been "born again".  Pagels remained fascinated by the power of the New Testament.  She started to learn Greek when she entered college, and read the Gospels in their original language. She graduated from Stanford University, earning a BA in 1964 and MA in 1965. After briefly studying dance at Martha Graham's studio, she began studying for a PhD in religion at Harvard University as a student of Helmut Koester and part of a team studying the Nag Hammadi library manuscripts.

Academic work 
Pagels completed her PhD in 1970, and joined the faculty at Barnard College. She headed its Department of Religion from 1974 until she moved to Princeton in 1982. In 1975, after studying the Pauline Epistles and comparing them to Gnosticism and the early Church, Pagels wrote the book, The Gnostic Paul which argues that Paul the Apostle was a source for Gnosticism and hypothesizes that Paul's influence on the direction of the early Christian church was great enough to inspire the creation of pseudonymous writings such as the Pastoral Epistles (First and Second Timothy and Titus), in order to make it appear that Paul was anti-Gnostic.

Pagels' study of the Nag Hammadi manuscripts was the basis for The Gnostic Gospels (1979), a popular introduction to the Nag Hammadi library. It was a best seller and won both the National Book Award in one-year category Religion/Inspiration
and the National Book Critics Circle Award. Modern Library named it one of the 100 best books of the twentieth century.  She follows the well-known thesis that Walter Bauer first put forth in 1934 and argues that the Christian church was founded in a society espousing contradictory viewpoints. A review of the book in the UK newspaper, The Sunday Times, led to the UK broadcaster, Channel 4, commissioning a major three-part series inspired by it, called Jesus: The Evidence.  The programme triggered a national furore, and marked a significant moment in the changes that religious broadcasting was already undergoing at that time.  As a movement Gnosticism was not coherent and there were several areas of disagreement among the different factions. According to Pagels's interpretation of an era different from ours, Gnosticism "attracted women because it allowed female participation in sacred rites".

In 1982, Pagels joined Princeton University as a professor of early Christian history. Aided by a MacArthur fellowship (1980–85), she researched and wrote Adam, Eve, and the Serpent, which examines the creation account and its role in the development of sexual attitudes in the Christian West. In both The Gnostic Gospels and Adam, Eve, and the Serpent, Pagels focuses especially on the way that women have been viewed throughout Jewish and Christian history. Her other books include The Origin of Satan (1995), Beyond Belief: The Secret Gospel of Thomas (2003), Reading Judas: The Gospel of Judas and the Shaping of Christianity (2007), and Revelations: Visions, Prophecy, and Politics in the Book of Revelation (2012).

In April 1987, Pagels's son Mark died after five years of illness, and in July 1988, her husband Heinz Pagels died in a mountain climbing accident. These personal tragedies deepened her spiritual awareness and afterwards Pagels began research leading to The Origin of Satan. This book argues that the figure of Satan became a way for Christians to demonize their religious and cultural opponents, namely, pagans, other Christian sects, and Jews.

Her New York Times bestseller, Beyond Belief: The Secret Gospel of Thomas (2003),  contrasts the Gospel of Thomas with the Gospel of John, and argues that a close reading of the works shows that while the Gospel of Thomas taught its adherents that "there is a light within each person, and it lights up the whole universe [-] If it does not shine, there is darkness", the Gospel of John emphasizes the revelation that God as Jesus Christ is the "light of the world". On Pagels' interpretation, the Gospel of Thomas claims, along with other non-canonical teachings, that Jesus was not God, but rather, a human teacher who sought to uncover the divine light in all human beings. This non-canonical viewpoint is in contradiction with the four New Testament gospels. Pagels argues that the Gospel of John was written as a rebuttal to the viewpoints put forth in the non-canonical Gospel of Thomas. She bases her conclusion on the theory that, in the Gospel of John, the apostle Thomas is portrayed as a disciple of little faith who cannot believe without seeing and, that the Gospel of John places an emphasis on Divine Jesus Christ as the center of belief, which Pagels views as a hallmark of early orthodoxy. Beyond Belief also includes Pagels' personal exploration of meaning during a time of loss and tragedy.

In 2012, Pagels received Princeton University's Howard T. Behrman Award for Distinguished Achievement in the Humanities for, as one nominator wrote, "her ability to show readers that the ancient texts she studies are concerned with the great questions of human existence though they may discuss them in mythological or theological language very different from our own." In 2015, Pagels was given the National Humanities Medal.

Reviews
Pagels and other scholars hold the Gospel of John as exposing the gnosticism advanced in the Gospel of Thomas, that was ultimately rejected in the church canon. Other scholars have reacted to these findings. Larry Hurtado claims that John portrays Thomas as no worse than, for example, Peter in John 21:15-23 where Peter is discomfited by being asked by Jesus whether he really loved him and Jesus' later admonishment of Peter and that the actions of Thomas in John 11 are portrayed no worse than that of the group of disciples. Hurtado notes that Thomas's request to see Jesus in the post-resurrection accounts is answered positively by Jesus and that Thomas is not represented polemically but as coming to faith.

Personal life
She married theoretical physicist Heinz Pagels in 1969, with whom she had a son and adopted two children. In April 1987, their son Mark died at age six and a half, followed 15 months later by the death of her husband in a climbing accident. Pagels married law professor Kent Greenawalt from Columbia University in June 1995. Each had been widowed about six years earlier, left with children. She had a son and a daughter, while Greenawalt had three sons.

The couple divorced in 2005.

Books
  - based on the author's thesis

Notes

References

Bibliography

External links
Faculty page, Princeton University Department of Religion

Diane Rogers, "The Gospel Truth," Stanford Magazine (January/February, 2004). – A profile of Elaine Pagels in the Stanford alumni magazine.
"The Politics of Christianity", Edge.org. – A talk by Pagels exploring some of the political issues raised by her work.

1943 births
Living people
American religion academics
American theologians
Proponents of Christian feminism
Harvard Divinity School alumni
MacArthur Fellows
National Book Award winners
Princeton University faculty
Stanford University alumni
American historians of religion
Writers from Palo Alto, California
American women historians
Historians of Gnosticism
National Humanities Medal recipients
Historians from California
21st-century American women